Tramser See is a lake in the Nordwestmecklenburg district in Mecklenburg-Vorpommern, Germany. At an elevation of 31.9 m, its surface area is 0.26 km2.

Lakes of Mecklenburg-Western Pomerania